Ianka Fleerackers (born 6 August 1971) is a Flemish stage, television and film actress and television presenter.

She landed her first part at age 14, playing a student in the TV series Meester, hij begint weer!. She had starring parts in the TV series Kulderzipken, Flikken,  and in LouisLouise where she plays Charlotte De Wilde.

She has two children.

Filmography

Film

Television

External links

 Personal webpage
 Wild Goose Stories, Company of Ianka Fleerackers
 iStoire, online magazine by Ianka Fleerackers and Rosemie Callewaert

1971 births
Living people
Flemish child actors
Flemish film actresses
Flemish television actresses
Flemish soap opera actresses
20th-century Flemish actresses
21st-century Flemish actresses
People from Bornem